Margarita Shtarkelova (Bulgarian: Маргарита Щъркелова; born 5 July 1951) is a Bulgarian former basketball player who competed in the 1976 Summer Olympics.

References

1951 births
Living people
Bulgarian women's basketball players
Olympic basketball players of Bulgaria
Basketball players at the 1976 Summer Olympics
Olympic bronze medalists for Bulgaria
Olympic medalists in basketball
Medalists at the 1976 Summer Olympics